Hello, My Name Is Frank is a 2014 American comedy drama film written and directed by Dale Peterson and starring Garrett M. Brown and Rachel DiPillo. It follows the titular Frank, who is diagnosed with Tourette syndrome, along with Laura, the daughter of his live-in caretaker who recently died, and her friends Kim and Alisa as they go on a road trip to visit the grave of a friend, Stephanie, who they had promised, before she died, that they'd visit on her 18th birthday.

Cast
 Garrett M. Brown as Frank Brown
 Rachel DiPillo as Laura
 Mary Kate Wiles as Kim
 Hayley Kiyoko as Alisa
 Travis Caldwell as Vinnie
 Kitty Swink as Louise
 Ray Xifo as Ray
 James DuMont as Dad in Park
 Nate Hartley as John
 Wayne Duvall as Preacher
 Brent Briscoe as Puggis
 Tess Harper as Aunt Flossie

Accolades
At the Manhattan Film Festival, the film won the Best Dramatic Feature Award and Brown garnered the Best Actor Award.

References

External links
 
 

American comedy-drama films
2014 films
2014 comedy films
2014 comedy-drama films
2010s English-language films
2010s American films